John Albert Ball (16 July 1923 – July 1999) was an English professional footballer who made 113 Football League appearances playing as a goalkeeper for Brighton & Hove Albion.

Life and career
Ball was born in Brighton, Sussex, where he attended Brighton Intermediate School. He joined Brighton & Hove Albion from Vernon Athletic in 1940 as an amateur, and turned professional three years later. In March 1943, he joined the RAF, and when competitive football resumed after the war, he made his debut in the Third Division South in October 1946. He broke his wrist a year later, losing his place to Harry Baldwin, and the two shared the position until 1952 when Baldwin left the club. Ball himself left in 1953 and joined Hastings United of the Southern League. He helped that club reach the third round of the FA Cup in both 1953–54 and 1954–55, and remained on their books until the early 1960s. He continued living in Hove, and died in Brighton in 1999.

References

1923 births
1999 deaths
Footballers from Brighton
English footballers
Association football goalkeepers
Brighton & Hove Albion F.C. players
Hastings United F.C. (1948) players
English Football League players
Southern Football League players
Military personnel from Sussex
Royal Air Force personnel of World War II